The  2018–19 season will be the 48th season of competitive football by CFR Cluj. CFR Cluj will compete in the Liga I, Cupa României and Champions League.

Season overview

Previous season positions

Players

Squad information

Transfers

In

Loans in

Out

Loans out

Overall transfer activity

Expenditure

Income

Net Totals

Preseason and friendlies

Competitions

Overview

Liga I

The Liga I fixture list was announced on 5 July 2018.

Regular season

Table

Results summary

Results by round

Matches

Championship round

Table

Results summary

Position by round

Matches

Cupa României

CFR Cluj will enter the Cupa României at the Round of 32.

Round of 32

Round of 16

Quarter-finals

Semi-finals

Supercupa României

CFR Cluj will play in the Romanian Supercup as winners of the Liga I against Cupa României winners Universitatea Craiova.

UEFA Champions League

As winners of the 2017-18 Liga I, CFR Cluj entered the Champions League at the second qualifying round.

Second qualifying round
The draw for the second round took place on 19 June. CFR Cluj was drawn to play against Swedish champions Malmö.

UEFA Europa League

After losing to Swedish champions Malmö, CFR Cluj progressed to the Europa League Third Qualifying Round.

Third qualifying round
The draw for the third round took place on 23 July. CFR Cluj was drawn to play against losing Armenian champions Alashkert.

Play-off Round
After emphatically beating Alashkert, CFR Cluj advanced to the play-off round. The draw for the play-off round took place on 6 August. CFR Cluj was drawn to play against Luxembourg champions F91 Dudelange.

Statistics

Appearances and goals

|-
|}

Squad statistics
{|class="wikitable" style="text-align: center;"
|-
! 
! style="width:70px;"|Liga I
! style="width:70px;"|Cupa României
! style="width:70px;"|Supercupa României
! style="width:70px;"|Champions League
! style="width:70px;"|Europa League
! style="width:70px;"|Home
! style="width:70px;"|Away
! style="width:70px;"|Total Stats
|-
|align=left|Games played       || 36 || 5 || 1 || 2 || 4 || 0 || 0 || 0
|-
|align=left|Games won          || 22 || 3 || 1 || 0 || 2 || 0 || 0 || 0
|-
|align=left|Games drawn        || 11 || 1 || 0 || 1 || 0 || 0 || 0 || 0
|-
|align=left|Games lost         || 3 || 1 || 0 || 1 || 2 || 0 || 0 || 0
|-
|align=left|Goals scored       || 54 || 6 || 1 || 1 || 9 || 0 || 0 || 0
|-
|align=left|Goals conceded     || 20 || 5 || 0 || 2 || 5 || 0 || 0 || 0
|-
|align=left|Goal difference    || 34 || 1 || 1 || -1 || 4 || 0 || 0 || 0
|-
|align=left|Clean sheets       || 0 || 3 || 1 || 0 || 2 || 0 || 0 || 0
|-
|align=left|Goal by Substitute || 0 || 0 || 0 || 0 || 0 || 0 || 0 || 0
|-
|align=left|Total shots        || – || – || – || – || – || – || – || –
|-
|align=left|Shots on target    || – || – || – || – || – || – || – || –
|-
|align=left|Corners            || – || – || – || – || – || – || – || –
|-
|align=left|Players used       || – || – || – || – || – || – || – || –
|-
|align=left|Offsides           || – || – || – || – || – || – || – || –
|-
|align=left|Fouls suffered     || – || – || – || – || – || –|| – || –
|-
|align=left|Fouls committed    || – || – || – || – || – || – || – || –
|-
|align=left|Yellow cards       || 0 || 0 || 0 || 0 || 0 || 0 || 0 || 0
|-
|align=left|Red cards          || 0 || 0 || 0 || 0 || 0 || 0 || 0 || 0
|-
|align=left| Winning rate      || 61.11% || 60.00% || 100% || 0% || 50.00% || 0% || 0% || 0%
|-

Goalscorers

Goal minutes

Last updated: 2018 (UTC) 
Source: cfr1907

Hat-tricks

Clean sheets

Disciplinary record

Attendances

See also

 2018–19 Cupa României
 2018–19 Liga I
 2018 Supercupa României
 2018–19 UEFA Champions League
 2018–19 UEFA Europa League

References

CFR Cluj seasons
CFR Cluj
CFR Cluj
CFR Cluj
Romanian football championship-winning seasons